The 2015 Masters of Formula 3 was the 25th edition of the Masters of Formula 3 event, a non-championship race for cars that conform to Formula Three regulations. The event was held on 20 September 2015 at Circuit Park Zandvoort, in Zandvoort, North Holland; it was the 23rd time that the circuit held the event.

For the first time since 1999, a qualification race was held alongside the main race but unlike previous years – where the qualification race eliminated drivers from the main race if they finished below a required position – all drivers contested the main Masters race itself.

Jagonya Ayam with Carlin driver Antonio Giovinazzi qualified second for the qualifying race, but after pole-sitter Sérgio Sette Câmara (Motopark) bogged down at the start, Giovinazzi moved into the lead and ultimately won the race by almost nine seconds ahead of another Motopark driver, Markus Pommer in second place. Sette Câmara completed the podium for the race. In the main Masters race, Giovinazzi moved clear at the start, and won the race by a similar margin to what he had done the previous day. As a result, Giovinazzi became the first Italian driver to win the event, and took his team's first win in the race since Takuma Sato in 2001. George Russell completed a 1–2 for Carlin after moving ahead of Pommer and Sette Câmara at the start, while Sette Câmara once again completed the podium.

Drivers and teams
All teams used Dallara chassis, model listed:

Classification

Qualifying

Qualifying Race

Race

References

External links
 Circuit Park Zandvoort website

Masters of Formula Three
Zandvoort
Zandvoort
Masters of Formula Three